We Own This City is an American miniseries based on the nonfiction book of the same name by Baltimore Sun reporter Justin Fenton. The miniseries was developed and written by George Pelecanos and David Simon, and directed by Reinaldo Marcus Green. The six-episode series premiered on HBO on April 25, 2022.

Premise
The miniseries details the rise and fall of the Baltimore Police Department's Gun Trace Task Force and the corruption surrounding it. The story centers on Sergeant Wayne Jenkins, one of eight officers who were convicted on various corruption charges in 2018 and 2019. It follows a non-linear narrative with frequent flashbacks.

Cast

Baltimore Police Department
 Jamie Hector as Sean Suiter, a BPD homicide detective caught up in the GTTF case
 Delaney Williams as Kevin Davis, the BPD police commissioner
 Don Harvey as John Sieracki, a BPD officer assigned to the public corruption task force who aided the FBI
 Larry Mitchell as Scott Kilpatrick, a veteran investigator with the Baltimore County Police Narcotics Unit
 Jermaine Crawford as Jaquan Dixon, a young BPD patrolman
 Chris Clanton as Brian Hairston, a BPD officer
 Christopher R. Anderson as Dean Palmere,  Deputy Commissioner of the Baltimore Police Department

Gun Trace Task Force (GTTF)
 Jon Bernthal as Sgt. Wayne Jenkins, the central figure in the Baltimore Police Department's (BPD) Gun Trace Task Force (GTTF)
 Josh Charles as Daniel Hersl, a BPD officer involved in the GTTF
 McKinley Belcher III as Momodu "G Money" Gondo, a BPD veteran and member of the GTTF
 Darrell Britt-Gibson as Jemell Rayam, a BPD officer involved in the GTTF
 Rob Brown as Maurice Ward, a plainclothes officer involved in the GTTF
 Ham Mukasa as Evodio Hendrix, a BPD officer involved in the GTTF
 Bobby J. Brown as Sgt. Thomas Allers, a BPD officer involved in the GTTF and Jenkins' predecessor
 Robert Harley as Marcus Taylor, a BPD officer involved in the GTTF

Federal law enforcement
 Wunmi Mosaku as Nicole Steele, an attorney assigned to the Civil Rights Division of the Department of Justice
 Dagmara Domińczyk as Erika Jensen, an FBI agent who investigated the GTTF
 Ian Duff as Ahmed Jackson, a former Department of Justice trial attorney who is now working for the Office of Civil Rights
 Lucas Van Engen as Leo Wise, the lead federal prosecutor assigned to the GTTF case
 Gabrielle Carteris as Andrea Smith, the head of the Organized Crime Drug Enforcement Task Force

Maryland law enforcement
 David Corenswet as David McDougall, a veteran investigator with the Harford County Narcotics Task Force
 Treat Williams as Brian Grabler, a retired Baltimore detective now teaching at the police academy
 Tray Chaney as Gordon Hawk, a recent addition to the Harford County Narcotics Task Force
 Domenick Lombardozzi as Stephen Brady, the president of the Baltimore City Fraternal Order of Police

Civilians
 Thaddeus Street as James Otis, a Baltimore resident and HVAC repairman
 Nathan E. Corbett as Tariq Touré, a West Baltimore author and community activist
 Paige Carter as Stephanie Rawlings-Blake, the Mayor of Baltimore

Episodes

Production
In March 2021, HBO ordered a six-episode series based on the book We Own This City: A True Story of Crime, Cops and Corruption by Baltimore Sun investigative journalist Justin Fenton, to be written by David Simon and George Pelecanos.

Filming
In May 2021, it was confirmed that Reinaldo Marcus Green would direct the series. Production was reported to begin in July 2021 with filming occurring in Baltimore. Production was temporarily halted for a week in September 2021 due to a "COVID-19 event".

Casting
In May 2021, Jon Bernthal, Josh Charles and Jamie Hector were announced to have been cast in leading roles. Darrell Britt-Gibson, Rob Brown, McKinley Belcher III, Larry Mitchell and Wunmi Mosaku were cast in June. In August, several castings were announced, including Dagmara Domińczyk, Don Harvey, Delaney Williams, David Corenswet, Ian Duff, Lucas Van Engen, Gabrielle Carteris, Treat Williams and Domenick Lombardozzi. In September, several recurring and guest roles were announced, including Thaddeus Street, Tray Chaney, Chris Clanton, Jermaine Crawford and Nathan E. Corbett.

Reception

Critical response
The review aggregator website Rotten Tomatoes reported a 93% approval rating with an average rating of 8.3/10, based on 54 critic reviews. The website's critics consensus reads, "A spiritual successor to The Wire with an even more pessimistic outlook on law enforcement, We Own This City deftly explores compromised individuals to paint an overall picture of systemic corruption." Metacritic, which uses a weighted average, assigned a score of 83 out of 100 based on 27 critics, indicating "universal acclaim".

Andy Greenwald of The Ringer said Jon Bernthal gave "one of the great TV performances of this century."

Notes

References

External links
 
 
 
 

2020s American drama television miniseries
2022 American television series debuts
2022 American television series endings
English-language television shows
Fictional portrayals of the Baltimore Police Department
HBO original programming
Television series by Home Box Office
Television series created by David Simon
Television series set in the 2010s
Television shows filmed in Maryland
Television shows set in Baltimore